A confraternity book (or confraternitatis), also called a liber memorialis (memorial book) or liber vitae (book of life), is a medieval register of the names of people who had entered into a state of spiritual brotherhood (confraternity) with a church or monastery in some way, often by visiting it in the capacity of a pilgrim. Persons named in such a book were actively remembered in the prayers of the priests or monks. In many cases these books were established as early as the 8th century and continued up to the 13th century. So-called Jahrtagsbücher (year books) are in many ways their successors.

Confraternity books are a rich source for prosopography and historical linguistics of the early Middle Ages.

List of confraternity books
The following is a list of some earlier medieval confraternity books:

 Confraternity book of the Abbey of Saint Gall
 Confraternity book of Reichenau Abbey
 Confraternity book of St Peter's Abbey, Salzburg
Liber memorialis of Remiremont Abbey
  Liber Vitae of the Imperial Abbey of Corvey
 Liber Vitae of Durham 
 Liber Vitae of the New Minster, Winchester and Hyde Abbey
 Liber Viventium of Pfäfers Abbey
 Memorial and Liturgiecodex of San Salvatore

Sources 
 
 Paulus Piper (Ed.): Libri Confraternitatum Sancti Galli Augiensis Fabariensis. In: Monumenta Germaniae Historica. Berlin 1894 (transcription of the Verbrüderungsbuch of St. Gallen with commentary)
 Franz Beyerle: Die Fratres de Friburch im St. Galler Verbrüderungsbuch. In: Schau-ins-Land. Published by the Breisgau-Verein Schau-ins-Land, Freiburg im Breisgau 1954

Christian genres
Christian monasteries in Germany
Christian monasticism
Documents of the Catholic Church
History of Catholicism in Germany
Medieval documents of Germany
Middle Ages Christian texts
Catholicism in the Middle Ages
Confraternities